Lieutenant Terence Edward Waters, GC (1 June 1929 – 22 April 1951), known as Terry Waters, was a British soldier who was awarded the George Cross in recognition of gallant and distinguished services whilst a prisoner of war of North Korea, having been captured at the Battle of the Imjin River during the Korean War. He died whilst being held captive at Pyongyang, Korea.

George Cross citation

Footnotes

1929 births
1951 deaths
West Yorkshire Regiment officers
British recipients of the George Cross
British prisoners of war in the Korean War
British Army personnel of the Korean War
British military personnel killed in the Korean War
Military personnel from Wiltshire